Senda Prohibida (English title: Forbidden Path) is the first telenovela produced in Mexico. It was produced by Telesistema Mexicano and was broadcast June 12, 1958, from Monday to Friday.

It stars Silvia Derbez as the protagonist / antagonist, with Francisco Jambrina, Dalia Íñiguez, Alicia Montoya and Héctor Gómez.

Plot
This is the story of an ambitious secretary, Nora (Silvia Derbez), who falls in love with her wealthy boss (Francisco Jambrina), who is married to a respectable woman (Dalia Iniguez), with whom he has a child (Hector Gomez). The provincial cunning, in exchange for caresses, receive gifts and jewelry from her boss which leads to his ruin. In the end, Nora cries in her wedding dress in front of her mirror, regretting all the damage she's done.

Cast
Silvia Derbez - Nora
Francisco Jambrina - Federico García
Dalia Íñiguez - Irene
Héctor Gómez - Roberto
Bárbara Gil
Julio Alemán
Augusto Benedico
María Idalia - Clemen
Luis Beristain
Alicia Montoya
Jorge Lavat
Miguel Suárez
Beatriz Sheridan
Rafael Banquells
María Antonieta de las Nieves - Dalia

References

External links 

Mexican telenovelas
1958 telenovelas
Televisa telenovelas
1958 Mexican television series debuts
1958 Mexican television series endings
Spanish-language telenovelas